Fiscal Studies is a quarterly peer-reviewed academic journal published by Wiley-Blackwell on behalf of the Institute for Fiscal Studies. The journal was established in 1979 and aims to bridge the gap between academic research and policy. The contents of the journal reflect a broad interpretation of “fiscal studies”, with articles tending to use applied microeconomics to consider how policies affect individuals, families, businesses and governments' finances. Published papers cover a broad range of topical issues. Recent examples include public finances since the recession, higher education finance, corporate taxation, labour supply, poverty and inequality, wealth, the measurement of well being and productivity. 

According to the Journal Citation Reports, the journal has a 2015 impact factor of 1.044, ranking it 52nd out of 96 journals in the category "Business, Finance" and 154th out of 347 journals in the category "Economics".

References

External links 
 

Wiley-Blackwell academic journals
English-language journals
Publications established in 1979
Quarterly journals
Business and management journals
Finance journals